Jo Tessem (born 28 February 1972) is a Norwegian footballer who currently plays as a midfielder for Wessex League Premier Division side Hythe & Dibden. Tessem is known for his versatility as a player, being able to play anywhere on the pitch. He plays mostly as an attacking midfielder or as forward.

Playing career

Norway
Tessem hails from Brekstad in Sør-Trøndelag, and his original club was Ørland BK. He played for this club in the lower divisions, but concentrated more on his professional career. He served in the Norwegian Armed Forces for a period, and worked at Værnes Air Station. He trained with local team Stjørdals-Blink at the time, but did not sign any contract. When enrolling at the Norwegian Police University College in Oslo in 1994, he needed to stay in shape and began training with Lyn, who were playing in the 1st Division at the time. He quickly showed off his talent, and was offered a professional contract. In the 1996-season, Tessem scored 15 goals in 22 matches, helping Lyn earn promotion to the highest division.

After four years in Oslo, Tessem transferred to Molde after the 1997 season. While playing here, he also worked part-time as a police officer.

Southampton
He was signed by Dave Jones for Southampton for £600,000 in 1999, and made his debut on 20 November 1999 at home to Tottenham Hotspur playing an unfamiliar role as right-back in place of the injured Jason Dodd. Although he was a midfielder he was extremely versatile and was often played as a striker in partnership with James Beattie.

He was a regular player up to the 2002–03 season and played in the FA Cup Final against Arsenal on 17 May 2003, coming on as a late substitute for Anders Svensson. His final tally for the Saints was 130 matches and 16 goals.

Back to Norway
Tessem returned to Lyn on loan for the first half of the 2004 season in Norway. He was then loaned out to Millwall where he scored once against Cardiff, before signing a three-year contract with Lyn at the start of the 2005 season. During the 2007 season, Jo Tessem announced that he was moving back to England after the season, because his wife was English, and they had decided to live there. He played 208 matches for Lyn from his debut in 1994 until he ended his Lyn Oslo relationship after the 2007 season.

He played for Lyn in the Norwegian Premier League in 2007, before deciding to move back to England, where his partner was born.

AFC Bournemouth
On 8 January 2008, Tessem joined AFC Bournemouth on a short-term deal. He had trained with the squad for over a month before signing.
Kevin Bond, the manager, said: "Jo has bags of experience. He's been playing the last two seasons in Norway, so he's been getting regular football and is still very fit. He doesn't miss anything on the ball and he uses it very well. His last season didn't end until November, so he's in good shape and ready to go. Hopefully, it'll prove an ideal move for us, as well as him."

Bournemouth were relegated to League Two after five successive seasons of League One football. Tessem had been playing under month-to-month contracts since joining the team, but Bournemouth could not offer a new contract by the end of the season due to their uncertain financial future.

In June 2009 Tessem went on trial at the Swedish club Örgryte IS in Allsvenskan. Due to an injury he did not sign a contract with the club. Only six days after he discontinued the negotiations with Örgryte Tessem went to England for a trial with Southampton in League One.

Totton & Eling
Tessem managed Wessex League side Totton & Eling in 2008–2009, winning the league with 100 points.

Eastleigh

Tessem signed for Eastleigh in February 2010. After 4 appearances Tessem left the club later in the month.

Totton & Eling
Tessem returned to Wessex League side Totton & Eling in summer 2010 in order to play for the club.

Hythe & Dibden
Having played several matches at the end of the 2017–18 season for the club, Tessem rejoined Wessex League Division One side Hythe & Dibden. He made 27 league appearances during the 2018–19 season, scoring ten goals.

Media career 
On 14 July 2022, it was announced he would join BBC Radio Solent, commentating on Southampton matches. 

Tessem remains registered as a player for Hythe & Dibden for the 2022-23 season, making himself available when his media duties allow.

Career statistics

Notes

International career
Jo Tessem has nine caps for his national side, earning his first cap on his 29th birthday in February 2001.

Honours
Southampton
FA Cup finalist: 2003

FC Lyn Oslo
Norwegian Cup finalist 1994, 2004

References

1972 births
Living people
People from Ørland
Norwegian footballers
Norwegian military personnel
Norway international footballers
Lyn Fotball players
Molde FK players
Eliteserien players
Premier League players
Southampton F.C. players
Millwall F.C. players
AFC Bournemouth players
English Football League players
Expatriate footballers in England
Norwegian expatriate footballers
Norwegian expatriate football managers
Norwegian expatriate sportspeople in England
Norwegian football managers
Norwegian police officers
Association football midfielders
FA Cup Final players
Sportspeople from Trøndelag
Wessex Football League players